Anatoly Timofeevich Fomenko (born 13 March 1945 in Stalino, USSR) is a Soviet and Russian conspiracy theorist, mathematician, professor at Moscow State University, well-known as a topologist, and a member of the Russian Academy of Sciences. He is the author of a fictitious pseudoscientific history known as New Chronology, based on works of Russian-Soviet writer Nikolai Alexandrovich Morozov. He is also a member of the Russian Academy of Natural Sciences (1991).

Biography

Fomenko is the son of Timothy Grigorievich Fomenko (Russian: Тимофей Григорьевич Фоме́нко), an industrial engineer, and Valentina Polikarpovna (née Markova) (Russian: Валентина Поликарповна Маркова), a philologist and teacher of Russian language and literature. His parents would later co-author his works on history in 1983 and 1996. Born in Donetsk, then called Stalino, he was raised and schooled in Magadan. In 1959, his family returned to Eastern Ukraine and settled in the city of Luhansk, where Fomenko attended Secondary School No. 26.  During secondary school, Fomenko participated in many competitions relating to mathematics and won several medals as a result. Also in 1959, the magazine "Pionyerskaya pravda" (Russian: Пионерская правда, Pioneer Truth) published his first known science fiction story, "The Mystery of the Milky Way".

Fomenko graduated from the Mechanics and Mathematics Faculty of Moscow State University in 1967, and in 1969 began working in the department of differential geometry in said faculty. In 1970 he defended his thesis "Classification of totally geodesic manifolds realizing nontrivial cycles in Riemannian homogeneous spaces", and in 1972 defended his doctoral thesis, "The decision of the multidimensional Plateau problems on Riemannian manifolds." In December 1981 he became a professor of the department of higher geometry and topology, and in 1992 became the head of the department of differential geometry.

Fomenko has served as the editor of several Russian-language mathematics journals and is a member of many councils overseeing dissertations in his field. In 1996, he won the State Prize of the Russian Federation for excellence in mathematics.

Mathematical work
  
Fomenko is a full member (Academician) of the Russian Academy of Sciences (1994), the International Higher Education Academy of Sciences (1993) and Russian Academy of Technological Sciences (2009), as well as a doctor of physics and mathematics (1972), a professor (1980), and head of the Differential Geometry and Applications Department of the Faculty of Mathematics and Mechanics in Moscow State University (1992). Fomenko is the author of the theory of topological invariants of an integrable Hamiltonian system. He is the author of 180 scientific publications, 26 monographs and textbooks on mathematics, a specialist in geometry and topology, variational calculus, symplectic topology, Hamiltonian geometry and mechanics, and computational geometry. Fomenko is also the author of a number of books on the development of new empirico-statistical methods and their application to the analysis of historical chronicles as well as the chronology of antiquity and the Middle Ages.

Fomenko is the author of extensive writings in his original fields of mathematics, and is also known for his original drawings inspired by topological objects and structures.

Historical revisionism
Fomenko is one of authors of a concept that manipulates historical chronology. It is known as New Chronology. Fomenko claims that he has discovered that many historical events do not correspond mathematically with the dates on which they are supposed to have occurred. He asserts from this that all of ancient history (including the history of Greece, Rome, and Egypt) is just a reflection of events that occurred in the Middle Ages and that all of Chinese and Arab history are fabrications of 17th- and 18th-century Jesuits.

He also claims that Jesus lived in the 12th century A.D. and was crucified on Joshua's Hill; that the Trojan War and the Crusades were the same historical event; and that Genghis Khan and the Mongols were actually Russians, that the lands west of the Thirteen Colonies that now constitute the American West and Middle West were a far eastern part of "Siberian-American Empire" prior to its disintegration in 1775, and many other theories, that contradict the conventional historiography. As well as disputing written chronologies, Fomenko also disputes scientific dating techniques such as dendrochronology and radiocarbon dating (see here for an examination of the latter criticism). His books include Empirico-statistical Analysis of Narrative Material and Its Applications and History: Fiction or Science?.

Most Russian scientists and worldwide historians consider Fomenko's historical works to be either pseudoscientific or antiscientific.

Artwork
Fomenko is a painter and illustrator whose work often depicts objects from mathematics, many related to topology.

Publications

Mathematical

 A.V.Bolsinov and A.T. Fomenko : Integrable Hamiltonian Systems: Geometry, Topology, Classification (Hardcover), 
 B. A. Dubrovin, S. P. Novikov, A.T. Fomenko Modern Geometry. Methods and Applications. Springer-Verlag, GTM 93, Part 1, 1984; GTM 104, Part 2, 1985. Part 3, 1990, GTM 124.
 A.T. Fomenko, V. V. Trofimov Integrable Systems on Lie Algebras and Symmetric Spaces. Gordon and Breach, 1987.
 A.T. Fomenko Differential Geometry and Topology Plenum Publishing Corporation. 1987. USA, Consultants Bureau, New York and London.
 A.T. Fomenko Integrability and Nonintegrability in Geometry and Mechanics. Kluwer Academic Publishers, The Netherlands, 1988.
 A.T. Fomenko Tensor and Vector Analysis: Geometry, Mechanics and Physics. – Taylor and Francis, 1988.
 A.T. Fomenko Symplectic Geometry. Methods and Applications. Gordon and Breach, 1988. Second edition 1995.
 A.T. Fomenko, S. P. Novikov The basic elements of differential geometry and topology. Kluwer Acad. Publishers, The Netherlands, 1990.
Mathematical Impressions, by A. T. Fomenko and Richard Lipkin, American Mathematical Society, 1990, 184 pp. 
 A.T. Fomenko The Plateau Problem (vols. 1, 2). Gordon and Breach, 1990. (Studies in the Development of Modern Mathematics.)
 A.T. Fomenko Variational Principles of Topology. Multidimensional Minimal Surface Theory. Kluwer Academic Publishers, The Netherlands, 1990.
 A.T. Fomenko Topological variational problems. – Gordon and Breach, 1991.
 A.T. Fomenko, Dao Chong Thi Minimal surfaces and Plateau problem. USA, American Mathematical Society, 1991.
 A.T. Fomenko, A.A.Tuzhilin Geometry of Minimal Surfaces in Three-Dimensional Space. USA, American Mathematical Society. In: Translation of Mathematical Monographs. vol.93, 1991.
 A.T. Fomenko Topological Classification of Integrable Systems. Advances in Soviet Mathematics, vol. 6. USA, American Mathematical Society, 1991.
 A.T. Fomenko Visual geometry and topology. Springer-Verlag, 1994.
 A.T. Fomenko, S.V.Matveev Algorithmic and Computer Methods for Three-Manifolds. Kluwer Academic Publishers, The Netherlands, 1997.
 A.T. Fomenko, T.L. Kunii Topological Modeling for Visualization. – Springer-Verlag, 1997.
 A.T. Fomenko, A. V. Bolsinov Integrable Hamiltonian Systems: Geometry, Topology, Classification. Taylor and Francis, 2003.

Pseudohistorical 
 Fomenko A.T. «Some new empirico–statistical methods of dating and the analysis of present global chronology»,— London: The British Library, Department of printed books. Cup. 918/87, 1981.
 A.T. Fomenko, V. V Kalashnikov., G. V. Nosovsky Geometrical and Statistical Methods of Analysis of Star Configurations. Dating Ptolemy's Almagest. – CRC-Press, USA, 1993.
 A.T. Fomenko Empirico-Statistical Analysis of Narrative Material and its Applications to Historical Dating. Vol.1: The Development of the Statistical Tools. Vol.2: The Analysis of Ancient and Medieval Records. – Kluwer Academic Publishers. The Netherlands, 1994.
 A.T. Fomenko New Methods of Statistical Analysis of Historical Texts. Applications to Chronology. Antiquity in the Middle Ages. Greek and Bible History. Vols.1, 2, 3. – Lewiston, New York: Edwin Mellen Press, 1999.
 Fomenko A.T. «Antiquity in the Middle Ages. Greek and Bible History», Lewiston, New York: Edwin Mellen Press, (Scholarly Monographs in the Russian Language), 1999.
 A.T. Fomenko et al.: History: Fiction or Science? Chronology 1, Introducing the problem. A criticism of the Scaligerian chronology. Dating methods as offered by mathematical statistics. Eclipses and zodiacs. 
 A.T. Fomenko et al.: History: Fiction or Science? Chronology 2, The dynastic parallelism method. Rome. Troy. Greece. The Bible. Chronological shifts. 
 A.T. Fomenko et al.: History: Fiction or Science? Chronology 3, Astronomical methods as applied to chronology. Ptolemy’s Almagest. Tycho Brahe. Copernicus. The Egyptian zodiacs. 
 Nosovsky G.V., Fomenko А.Т. «Russia. Britain. Byzantium. Rome. History: Fiction or Science? Chronology vol. IV»,— Paris, London, New York: Mithec, Delamere Resources LLC, 2008, 727 pp.

References

External links
 
 Extra-mathematical associations in mathematical images 
 New Chronology official site (English language) 
 New Chronology analysis and criticism (Russian language)
 

1945 births
20th-century Russian mathematicians
21st-century Russian mathematicians
Chronologists
Living people
Full Members of the Russian Academy of Sciences
Academic staff of Moscow State University
People from Donetsk
Pseudohistorians
Russian people of Ukrainian descent
Topologists
Textbook writers
Proponents of alternative chronologies